Saint Lawrence or Laurence (lit. "laurelled"; 31 December AD 225 – 10 August 258) was one of the seven deacons of the city of Rome under Pope Sixtus II who were martyred in the persecution of the Christians that the Roman Emperor Valerian ordered in 258.

Life 

St. Lawrence is thought to have been born on 31 December AD 225, in Valencia (or less probably, in Huesca), the town from which his parents came in the later region of Aragon that was then part of the Roman province of Hispania Tarraconensis. The martyrs Orentius and Patientia are traditionally held to have been his parents.

Lawrence encountered the future Pope Sixtus II, a famous teacher born in Greece, in Caesaraugusta (Zaragoza), and  they travelled together from  Spain to Rome. When Sixtus became the Pope in 257, he ordained the young Lawrence who was only 22, as a deacon, and later  and appointed him as "archdeacon of Rome", the first among the seven deacons who served in the cathedral church. This was a position of great trust that included the care of the treasury and riches of the Church and the distribution of alms to the indigent.

St. Cyprian, Bishop of Carthage, noted that, at the time, the norm was that  Christians who were denounced were executed, and all their goods confiscated by the Imperial treasury. At the beginning of August 258, the Emperor Valerian issued an edict that all bishops, priests, and deacons should immediately be put to death. Pope Sixtus II was captured on 6 August 258, at the cemetery of St. Callixtus while celebrating the liturgy and executed immediately.

After the death of Sixtus, the prefect of Rome demanded that Lawrence turn over the riches of the Church, and St. Ambrose wrote that Lawrence asked for three days to gather the wealth.,  distributed as much Church property to the poor, presented himself and the city's poor to the Prefect as the true wealth of the church, and was martyred on the 10th.

Martyrdom 

As a deacon in Rome, Lawrence was responsible for the material goods of the Church and the distribution of alms to the poor. Ambrose of Milan related that when the treasures of the Church were demanded of Lawrence by the prefect of Rome, he brought forward the poor, to whom he had distributed the treasure as alms. "Behold in these poor persons the treasures which I promised to show you; to which I will add pearls and precious stones, those widows and consecrated virgins, which are the Church's crown." The prefect was so angry that he had a great gridiron prepared with hot coals beneath it and had Lawrence placed on it, hence Lawrence's association with the gridiron. After the martyr had suffered pain for a long time, the legend concludes, he cheerfully declared: "I'm well done on this side. Turn me over!" From this, St. Lawrence derives his patronage of cooks, chefs, and comedians.

Lawrence was sentenced at San Lorenzo in Miranda and imprisoned in San Lorenzo in Fonte, where he baptized fellow prisoners. He was martyred in San Lorenzo in Panisperna, and was buried in San Lorenzo fuori le Mura. The Almanac of Filocalus for 354 states that he was buried in the Catacomb of Cyriaca on the Via Tiburtina by Hippolytus and Justin the Confessor, a presbyter. One of the early sources for his martyrdom was the description of Aurelius Prudentius Clemens in his Peristephanon, Hymn 2.

Despite the Church being in possession of the actual gridiron, historian Patrick J. Healy opines that the traditional account of how Lawrence was martyred is "not worthy of credence," as the slow, lingering death cannot be reconciled "with the express command contained in the edict regarding bishops, priests, and deacons (animadvertantur) which ordinarily meant decapitation." A theory of how the tradition arose is proposed that as the result of a mistake in transcription, the omission of the letter "p" – "by which the customary and solemn formula for announcing the death of a martyr – passus est ["he suffered," that is, was martyred] – was made to read assus est [he was roasted]." The Liber Pontificalis, which is held to draw from sources independent of the existing traditions and Acta regarding Lawrence, uses passus est concerning him, the same term it uses for Pope Sixtus II, who was martyred by decapitation during the same persecution 4 days earlier.

Emperor Constantine I is held to have erected a small oratory in honour of Lawrence, which was a station on the itineraries of the graves of the Roman martyrs by the seventh century. Pope Damasus I rebuilt or repaired the church, now the Basilica di San Lorenzo fuori le Mura, while the Minor Basilica of San Lorenzo in Panisperna was erected over the site of his martyrdom. The gridiron of the martyrdom was placed by Pope Paschal II in the Minor Basilica of San Lorenzo in Lucina.

Associated Roman churches 

The Roman Catholic Church erected six churches on the sites in Rome traditionally associated with his martyrdom:

Minor Basilica of St Lawrence in Damaso (Basilica Minore di San Lorenzo in Damaso): site where he performed his duties as deacon of Rome;
Minor Basilica of St Mary in Domnica alla Navicella (Basilica Minore di Santa Maria in Domnica alla Navicella): site where he customarily distributed alms to the indigent;
Annexed Church of St Lawrence in Miranda (Chiesa Annessa San Lorenzo de’ Speziali in Miranda): site of his sentencing and condemnation by the Prefect of Rome;
Annexed Church of St Lawrence in Fonte (Chiesa Annessa San Lorenzo in Fonte): site of his imprisonment by the centurion Ippolito and of the fountain in which the Saint baptized his fellow prisoners;
Church of St Lawrence in Panisperna (Chiesa di San Lorenzo in Panisperna): site of his actual martyrdom/death and the oven used to roast him to death; and
Papal Minor Basilica of St Lawrence outside the Walls (Basilica Minore Papale di San Lorenzo fuori le Mura: site of his burial and sepulchre.

Also in Rome are three other significant churches that are dedicated to Saint Lawrence but not associated with his life:
Minor Basilica of St Lawrence in Lucina (Basilica Minore di San Lorenzo in Lucina), which possesses the relics of the gridiron on which and the chains with which he was martyred;
Church of St. Lawrence in Palatio ad Sancta Sanctorum, Pontifical Sanctuary of the Holy Stairs (Chiesa di San Lorenzo in Palatio ad Sancta Sanctorum, Pontificio Santuario della Scala Santa), proximate to the Archbasilica of St. John in Laterano, which was originally a private Papal chapel when the edifice that houses it was a Papal palace, and which housed some of the most precious relics of the Roman Catholic Church, hence the title "Sancta Sanctorum" ("Holy of Holies"); and
Church of St Lawrence in Piscibus (Chiesa di San Lorenzo in Piscibus), which is proximate to the Basilica of St. Peter

Miracles 

The life and miracles of Lawrence were collected in The Acts of St Lawrence but those writings have been lost. The earliest existing documentation of miracles associated with him is in the writings of Gregory of Tours (538–594), who mentions the following:

The mediaeval Church of St Mary Assumed (Chiesa di Santa Maria Assunta) in the small commune of Amaseno, Lazio, Italy houses the famous reliquary of the ampulla containing relics of Lawrence, namely a quantum of his blood, a fragment of his flesh, some fat and ashes. Tradition holds that annually, on the Feast of St. Lawrence, and sometimes on other occasions, the blood in the ampulla miraculously liquefies during the Feast and re-coagulates by the following day.

Veneration 

Due to his conspiring to hide and protect the written documents of the Church, Lawrence is known as the patron saint of archivists and librarians.

Roman Catholic Church 

Lawrence is one of the most widely venerated saints of the Roman Catholic Church. Legendary details of his death were known to Damasus, Prudentius, Ambrose, and Augustine. Devotion to him was widespread by the fourth century. His liturgical celebration on 10 August has the rank of feast in the General Roman Calendar, consistent with the oldest of Christian calendars, e. g. the Almanac of Philocalus for the year 354, the inventory of which contains the principal feasts of the Roman martyrs of the middle of the fourth century. He remains one of the saints enumerated in the "Roman Canon" of the Holy Mass as celebrated in the Latin Church.

Lawrence is especially honoured in the city of Rome, of which he is considered the third patron after St. Peter and St. Paul. The church built over his tomb, the Papal Minor Basilica di San Lorenzo fuori le Mura, became one of the seven principal churches of Rome and a favourite place of Roman pilgrimages. The area proximate to the Basilica di San Lorenzo fuori le Mura is named the "Quartiere San Lorenzo".

Because the Perseid Meteor Shower typically occurs annually in mid-August on or proximate to his feast day, some refer to the shower as the "Tears of St Lawrence".

His intercession to God is invoked by librarians, archivists, comedians, cooks and tanners as their patron. He is the patron saint of Ampleforth Abbey, whose Benedictine monks founded one of the world's leading public schools for Catholics, located in North Yorkshire (North East England).

On his feast the reliquary containing his burnt head is displayed in the St. Peter's Basilica for veneration.

Anglican Communion 

Within Anglicanism Lawrence's name is traditionally spelled Laurence or Lawrence. His feast is on 10 August which is in the calendar of the Book of Common Prayer, the volume of prayers which, in its 1662 format, was the founding liturgical document of a majority of Anglican provinces. In the Book of Common Prayer the feast is titled "S Laurence, Archdeacon of Rome and Martyr". His feast on 10 August has been carried into the contemporary calendars of most Anglican provinces, Laurence is remembered in the Church of England with a Lesser Festival under the title "Laurence, deacon, martyr, 258" on 10 August.

Anglo-Catholics venerate Lawrence, who is the patron of many Anglican parish churches, including 228 in England. A major church in Sydney, Australia, in the former civil parish of St Laurence, is known as "Christ Church St Laurence". The Anglican charitable society, Brotherhood of St Laurence also bears his name.

Legacy 
According to Francesco Moraglia the role of deacon is distinguished by service of the poor. He is destined both to the service of the table (corporal works of mercy) and to the service of the word (spiritual works of mercy). "The beauty, power and the heroism of [d]eacons such as Lawrence help to discover and come to a deeper meaning of the special nature of the diaconal ministry."

Many churches, schools, parishes, towns, and geographic features throughout the world are named for Lawrence of Rome. Depending on locality they are named St. Lawrence, St. Laurence, San Lorenzo, St. Laurent, St. Lorenz or similarly in other languages. San Lorenzo del Escorial, the monastery built by King Philip II of Spain, commemorates his victory at the Battle of St. Quentin (1557) on the Feast of St. Lawrence. The monastery and the attached palace, college, and library are laid out in a grid pattern that resembles the gridiron of Lawrence's martyrdom. The gridiron of Lawrence is also thought the basis of the design of the Certosa di San Lorenzo di Padula, which is a monastery in Padula, Salerno, Italy. Two universities bear his name: St. Lawrence University (non-Catholic) in Canton, St. Lawrence County, New York, United States, and St. Lawrence University in Kampala, Uganda. There is a school named after him in Kolkata named St.Lawrence High School,Kolkata.

Canada's patron saint is St. Lawrence. On his second voyage, French explorer Jacques Cartier, arriving in the river estuary of the North American Great Lakes on the Feast of St. Lawrence in 1535, named it the Gulf of St. Lawrence.
The river emptying into the gulf was named the St. Lawrence River. Many names in what are now Québec and the Maritime Provinces of Canada are references to this important seaway, e. g., the Laurentian mountains north of the city of Montreal, Saint-Laurent (borough), Saint Lawrence Boulevard which spans the width of the Island of Montreal, and St. Lawrence County, New York, United States near Lake Ontario. 
In the province of Ontario, St. Lawrence is a prominent, historic neighbourhood in old centre of Toronto (formerly named York), now most known for the expansive St. Lawrence Market. The Laurentian Mountains gave rise to the name for the Laurential Plateau, or the Canadian Shield. In Switzerland, Saint Lawrence is represented on the coat of arms of the city of Bülach with a gridiron.

The rescue operation for the miners trapped in the 2010 Copiapó mining accident in Chile was named Operacíon San Lorenzo after Lawrence, patron saint of miners.

In Freemasonry the Order of St. Lawrence the Martyr is a masonic degree whose ritual is based upon the story of Lawrence. It is one of the constituent degrees of the Allied Masonic Degrees.

Bernalillo, New Mexico celebrates three days of devotions to the Saint, in honor a devotional promise made by Spanish settlers during the 1692 Pueblo Revolt. Among the festivities are a set of dances performed by matachines. An image of the saint is kept in the house of a local family throughout the year, and a vigil and feast are held from 9–11 August. It is one of the oldest dancing processions in the New World.

Patronage 

 Against Fire
 Against Lumbago
 Archives and Archivists
 Armouries and Armourers
 Barbecues
 Brewers
 Butchers
 Comedians
 Cooks, chefs and restaurant owners
 Cutlers
 Deacons
 Glaziers and stained glass workers
 Laundry workers
 Libraries and librarians
 Miners
 Paupers and poor people
 Seminarians
 Students
 Tanners
 Viticulturists, wine makers and wine sellers
 Abano Terme, Italy
 Alba, Italy
 Angrogna, Italy
 Bernalillo, New Mexico, USA
 Berzo Demo, Italy
 Berzo Inferiore, Italy
 Brissogne, Italy
 Cabella Ligure, Italy
 Camino, Italy
 Canada
 Cavatore, Italy
 Chambave, Italy
 Denice, Italy
 Esbonderup, Denmark
 Folgaria, Italy
 Gamalero, Italy
 Gross Gartach, Germany
 Győrszemere, Hungary
 Huesca, Spain
 Il-Birgu, Malta
 Ilaya, Dapitan City, Philippines 
 Limbazi, Latvia
 Lund, Sweden
 Montevarchi, Italy
 Mortara, Italy
 Naurod, Germany
 Oldenburg, Lower Saxony, Germany
 Pontinvrea, Italy
 Rome
 Rotterdam
 San Lawrenz, Malta
 Santena, Italy
 Scala, Italy
 Seravezza, Italy
 Sri Lanka
 Tivoli, Italy
 Zagarolo, Italy

Source

Gallery

In popular culture 

In Fargo, season 1, episode 3, Lorne Malvo notes the stained glass window of St Lawrence in Stavros' office, in response to which Stavros narrates his martyrdom, in "A Muddy Road".

In the video game Dota 2 created by Valve, Lina the Slayer's dying voice line "Turn me over... I'm done" is a reference to Lawrence of Rome.

In a scene in the 1992 film, Lorenzo's Oil, Augusto, Michaela, and Lorenzo tell a story about St Lawrence and refer to his Feast Day as "The Night of The Shooting Stars."

In music 
Marc-Antoine Charpentier, Motet de Saint Laurent, H.321, for 1 voice, 2 treble instruments and contino (mid-1670s?)

See also 
 Saint Lawrence, patron saint archive

Several other saints were also named "Lawrence" (or the corresponding local variant), so one might also occasionally encounter something named after one of them.
More information on these topics can currently be accessed through disambiguation articles like:
 Saint Lawrence (disambiguation)
 San Lorenzo (disambiguation)
 St. Laurence's Church (disambiguation)

References

External links 

 Henry Wace, A Dictionary of Christian Biography: Laurentius
 Golden Legend: "The Life of Saint Laurence"
 Leo I: Sermon on St Lawrence
 Church of Saint Lawrence, Birgu, Malta
 Patron of Ampleforth Abbey, North Yorkshire
 Colonnade Statue in St Peter's Square
 CatholicSaints
 Santiebeati
 Vatican.va

225 births
258 deaths
3rd-century Romans
Deacons
Saints from Hispania
Burials at San Lorenzo fuori le mura
3rd-century Christian martyrs
Anglican saints